The following lists show the sound broadcasting stations that broadcast from the state of Mexico, Mexico, in the bands of MF (amplitude modulation) and VHF (frequency modulation), registered with the Federal Institute of Telecommunications.

Actives

Historical

Defunct formats

Frequency changes

References

Mexico
State of Mexico